In an organized sports league, a typical season is the portion of one year in which regulated games of the sport are in session: for example, in Major League Baseball the season lasts approximately from the last week of March to the last week of September. In other team sports, like association football or basketball, it is generally from August or September to May although in some countries - such as Northern Europe or East Asia - the season starts in the spring and finishes in autumn, mainly due to weather conditions encountered during the winter.

A year can often be broken up into several distinct sections (sometimes themselves called seasons). These are: a preseason, a series of exhibition games played for training purposes; a regular season, the main period of the league's competition; the postseason, a playoff tournament played against the league's top teams to determine the league's champion; and the offseason, the time when there is no official competition.

Preseason 

In association football, many clubs tour and then they have a series of exhibition games for training purposes.

In baseball, many clubs go to spring camp and then they have spring training.
The National Football League preseason is a highly structured three-game series of games in which teams are afforded a larger roster limit and play games that do not count toward the record. It is used to evaluate and prepare talent for the upcoming regular season.

In the highest levels of professional tennis, the preseason (November–December) consists of extensive period of training on and off the court (gym/fitness work as well as working on tennis-specific skills like for example improving the accuracy of serve).

Regular season
In sport, the term "regular season" or "home and away season" refers to the sport's league competition. The regular season is usually similar to a group tournament format: teams are divided into groups, conferences and/or divisions, and each club plays a set number of games against a set number of opponents. In most countries the league is played in a double round-robin format, where every team plays every other team twice, once at their home venue, and once away at the opposition's venue as visitors. The results over all games are accumulated and when every team has completed its full schedule of games, a winner is declared.

In North America, the scheduling is different. Rather than every team playing all others twice, teams usually play more games against local rivals than teams in other parts of the country. For example, the NBA's Los Angeles Lakers will play the Los Angeles Clippers (a team within their division, a subdivision of the conference) four times in a regular season, while both will only play the Toronto Raptors, who are in the opposite Eastern Conference, twice. Part of this is due to the vast geographic distances between some teams in North America — measured in a straight line, Los Angeles is 3,494 kilometres from Toronto, for instance — and a desire to limit travel expenses. In the scheduling system used in the NFL, it is possible for two teams to only meet every four years, and to only have 2 common opponents in a season. Major League Baseball has the most uneven schedules of all the four major North American sports. In MLB, the conferences are called leagues instead, but have exactly the same effect as conferences (as with all North American major leagues, leagues, conferences, and division are not based on skill, but instead geography, history, and rivalries). Teams play 19 games against each of the teams in their own division each year but will only play 20 games total against all of the teams in the other league. Because each of the inter-league match-ups is part of a 3-game series or a 2-game series, teams will play no games at all against most teams from the other league. They play 6 of the 15 teams in the other league, a historically high number (until 1997, interleague play was limited to exhibition matches and the postseason World Series, and thus MLB teams did not play the other league's teams at all).

In Australia, the two largest football leagues, the AFL (Australian rules football) and NRL (rugby league), both grew out of competitions held within a single city (respectively Melbourne and Sydney) and only began expanding to the rest of the country when inexpensive air travel made a national league possible. These leagues use a single table instead of being split into divisions. The term "home and away season" is sometimes used instead of regular season.

Many football leagues in Latin America have a very different system. Because most Latin American countries never had a football cup competition, they instead split their season into two parts, typically known as the Apertura and Clausura (Spanish for "opening" and "closing"). Most countries that use this system, Argentina being one notable example, crown separate league champions for each part of the season, using only league play. A few others, such as Uruguay, crown one champion at the end of a playoff involving top teams from each half of the season. Mexico operates its Apertura and Clausura as separate competitions that both end in playoffs. Brazil has a different system, the season starts with the state championships in January (every Brazilian state have his own championship), these state championships ends in April. The Campeonato Brasileiro Série A itself starts in May and ends in early December, and is played in a double round-robin format in the same way as the European championships.

A system similar to the Apertura and Clausura developed independently in Philippine professional basketball, with formerly two, now three tournaments (called "conferences") in one season, with each conference divided into an "elimination round" (the single round-robin group stage) and the playoffs in the North American sense. Winning the playoffs is the ultimate goal of every team for every conference; while there is no season championship, winning all conferences within a single season is rare and has only happened five times since 1975, with the two most recent examples occurring in 1996 and 2013–14. The qualifying round and playoffs setup has permeated down to the local level and in most team sports, although seasons are not divided into conferences.

Postseason

Many sports leagues have playoffs or "finals" that occur after the regular season is complete. A subset of the teams enter into a playoff tournament, usually a knockout tournament, generally a pre-determined number with better overall records (more wins, fewer losses) during the regular season. There are many variations used to determine the champion, the league's top prize. In many of these leagues, winning the league's top prize at the conclusion of the postseason is more important than winning the regular season. This includes the five major U.S. and Canada sports leagues (Super Bowl, Stanley Cup Finals, NBA Finals, World Series and MLS Cup), the major Australian sports (BBL Grand Final,  NBL Grand Final, A-League Grand Final, AFL Grand Final and NRL Grand Final) and the CFL's Grey Cup.

European leagues have also started holding playoffs after a double round-robin "regular season". The Football League started its promotion playoffs in 1987, with the third up to the sixth-ranked teams participating for the final promotion berth (the two top teams are automatically promoted). Elsewhere, relegation playoffs are also held to determine which teams would be relegated to the lower leagues. One prominent top-level football league, the Eredivisie of the Netherlands, uses two different playoffs—one for relegation purposes, and the other to determine one of the league's entrants in the following season's UEFA Europa League. In Superleague Greece, which currently has two places in the UEFA Champions League and three in the Europa League, the teams that finish second through fifth in the regular season enter a home-and-away "playoff" mini-league. Since one Europa League place is reserved for the country's cup winner, only three of the four teams are guaranteed a place in the next season's European competitions (unless both the cup winner and runner-up are already qualified for Europe by other means). The playoff determines the country's second Champions League participant, and the points at which the two or three Europa League entrants join that competition. Conversely, some leagues like the Premier League do not hold a postseason, and therefore these leagues' champions and relegation are instead based on the regular season records.

Although rugby union did not become professional until 1995, that sport has a long history of playoffs, primarily in France and the Southern Hemisphere. The French national championship, now known as Top 14, staged a championship final in its first season of 1892, first used more than one round of playoffs in 1893, and has continuously operated a playoff system (except during the two World Wars) since 1899. South Africa's Currie Cup has determined its champions by playoffs since 1968, and New Zealand's National Provincial Championship, the top level of which is now known as the Mitre 10 Cup, has used playoffs since its creation in 1976. Argentina's Nacional de Clubes has determined its champion by playoffs since its inception in 1993. Currently, two separate competitions feed into the Nacional, the Torneo de la URBA (for Buenos Aires clubs, held since 1899) and Torneo del Interior (for the rest of the country); both use playoffs to determine their champions. Super Rugby, involving regional franchises from Australia, New Zealand, and South Africa and national franchises in Argentina and Japan, has used playoffs to determine its champions since its creation as Super 12 in 1996.

By contrast, other European countries were slow to adopt playoffs in rugby union. The English Premiership only began playoffs in 1999–2000, and did not use them to determine the league champion until 2002-03. The Celtic League, now known as Pro14, resisted a playoff system even longer; its champions were determined solely by league play from its inception in 2001–02 until playoffs began in 2009–10.

When the UEFA Champions League reformatted in 1993, it added a "knockout stage" involving four teams that finished at the top two places in their respective groups. Like North American sports leagues, this setup prevented some participants from facing each other, necessitating a two-round knockout stage to determine the champions. It has since been expanded to the 4-round knockout stage today. The Copa Libertadores has applied a knockout stage since the 1988 tournament, expanding to the current four-round format next season. All intercontinental club football competitions now feature a knockout stage.

Off-season

The off-season, vacation time, or close season is the time of year when there is no official competition. Although upper management continues to work, the athletes will take much vacation time off. Also, various events such as drafts, transfers and important off-season free agent signings occur. Generally, most athletes stay in shape during the off-season in preparation for the next season. Certain new rules in the league may be made during this time, and will become enforced during the next regular season.

As most countries which have a league in a particular sport will operate their regular season at roughly the same time as the others, international tournaments may be arranged during the off season.

For example, most European football league club competitions run from July or August to May, subsequently major international competitions such as the FIFA World Cup and UEFA European Football Championship are organised to occur in June and July.

Seasons by league

The table represents typical seasons for some leagues by month. Blank or white denotes off-season and pre-season months and solid colors mark the rest of the year. Leagues in the same sport use the same color.
"E" denotes exhibition/preseason games.
"Q" denotes pre-competition qualifiers.
"S" denotes the start of the regular-season.
"P" denotes playoff(s)/postseason/knockout stages.
"F" denotes Final(s).

Summary

Notes and references

See also 
 Domestic association football season

Terminology used in multiple sports